Lee or Leigh Woods may refer to:

Places
Leigh Woods, Somerset
Leigh Woods National Nature Reserve

Others
Lee Woods (artist) of Clamecy, Nièvre
Lee Woods, character in 2 Days in the Valley
Lee Woods (radio personality) Classic name in the Radio industry, San Antonio, TX DJ Hall of Fame inductee.

See also

Lee Wood, Devon, location of an Iron Age settlement